Behshad Yavarzadeh (born January 7, 1983, in Iran) is an Iranian American retired football player, who last played for Udon Thani in the Thai Regional League Division. He usually plays as a midfielder. Despite playing on one of the bottom-ranking teams in Slovakia, he has proven to be a moderate success and has scored and assisted in his recent appearances as a starter.

Return to Udon Thani
On 16 June 2016, Yavarzadeh returned to Udon Thani by signing a one-and-a-half-year contract. On 28 June 2016, he made his first appearance for the Udon Thani in Thai Regional League Division. On 3 July 2016, he first provided an assist in Thai Regional League Division. He also assisted one goal in Udon Thani On August 4, 2014. Behshad scored his first goal on 14 August 2016 in Thai Regional League Division.

Club career statistics
 

 Assist Goals

Honours

Club
Steel Azin
Azadegan League: 2008–09

DAC Dunajská Streda
Slovak Cup: 2009–10 (Semifinals)

Paykan
Azadegan League: 2011–12 2013–14

Udon Thani
Thai Regional League Division: 2016 Thai Regional League Division

Personal life
Yavarzadeh permanent residence in the Santa Monica , Los Angeles , California , United States of America by Green Card Lottery and behshad in this way has been achieved Permanent residence United States of America.

References

External links
PersianLeague Profile
https://web.archive.org/web/20060220161506/http://www.fcdac1904.com/
DAC 1904 Dunajska Streda A Team Player Profiles
http://www.fcdac1904.com/uvod.str.en.htm
http://www.ta3.com/sk/odporucenie/blacklist/YmVoc2hhZHlhdmFyemFkZWhAeWFob28uY29t
https://web.archive.org/web/20110728073729/http://www.ta3.com/sk/reportaze/151204_futbal-corgon-liga-dunajska-streda-ban-bystrica-1-1

1983 births
Living people
Iranian footballers
Esteghlal F.C. players
Tarbiat Yazd players
Steel Azin F.C. players
Paykan F.C. players
Rah Ahan players
FC DAC 1904 Dunajská Streda players
Dubai CSC players
Iranian expatriate footballers
Iranian expatriate sportspeople in Thailand
Slovak Super Liga players
Expatriate footballers in Slovakia
Expatriate footballers in the United Arab Emirates
Expatriate footballers in Thailand
Expatriate footballers in Myanmar
UAE Pro League players
Asian Games bronze medalists for Iran
Behshad Yavarzadeh
Asian Games medalists in football
Footballers at the 2006 Asian Games
Association football midfielders
Medalists at the 2006 Asian Games